Spencer List (born April 6, 1998) is an American actor. List is best known from the Fox show Fringe. He has played Carter in The Fosters and its spin-off Good Trouble. He has also been on Law & Order: Special Victims Unit and Jack Ketchum's Offspring.

Filmography

References

External links

21st-century American male actors
Male actors from Florida
American male child actors
American male film actors
American male television actors
Living people
American twins
Fraternal twin male actors
1998 births